The 1986–87 Toto Cup Artzit was the 3rd season of the second tier League Cup (as a separate competition) since its introduction. 

It was held in two stages. First, the 16 Liga Artzit teams were divided into four groups. The group winners advanced to the semi-finals, which, as was the final, were held as one-legged matches. 

The competition was won by Hapoel Haifa, who had beaten Hapoel Acre 3–2 in the final.

Group stage

Group A

Group B

Group C

Group D

Elimination rounds

Semifinals

Final

See also
 1986–87 Toto Cup Leumit

External links
 Toto Cup Artzit 1985/86  

Artzit
Toto Cup Artzit
Toto Cup Artzit